L Ibomcha Singh  is a boxing coach from Manipur in India. In 2010, he was awarded the Dronacharya Award for his services to boxing by the Indian government.

Career as an athlete
Ibomcha was the first boxer to win the state a National medal in boxing when he won the bronze in the 1981 National Games.

Career as a coach
Ibomcha has produced 38 international medalists in boxing including two Arjuna awardees, two Olympians, two world champions and one world military games champion.  His trainees included five times world women boxing champion Mangte Chungneijang Merykom, Laishram Sarita Devi N.G. Dingko Singh, P Narjit, S Suresh, and M Suranjoy.

References

Indian male boxers
Boxers from Manipur
Recipients of the Dronacharya Award
Living people
Indian boxing coaches
Year of birth missing (living people)